Vítězslav is a Czech given name. It may refer to:
Vítězslav Hálek (1835–1874), Czech writer
Karel Vítězslav Mašek (1865–1927), Czech artist
Vítězslav Novák (1870–1949), Czech composer
Ludvík Vítězslav Čelanský (1870–1931), Czech conductor and composer
Vítězslav Nezval (1900–1958), Czech avant-garde writer
Vítězslav Lederer (1904–1972), known for escaping from Auschwitz in 1944
Vítězslav Pavlousek (born 1911), Czech sailor
Vítězslav Hloušek (born 1914), Czech basketball player
Vítězslav Lahr (born 1929), Czech skier
Vítězslav Svozil (born 1933), Czech swimmer
Vítězslav Országh (born 1943), Czech weightlifter
Vítězslav Mácha (born 1948), Czech wrestler
Vítězslav Ďuriš (born 1954), Czechoslovak ice hockey player
Vítězslav Jureček (born 1960), Czech biathlete
Vítězslav Lavička (born 1963), Czech footballer and manager
Vítězslav Tuma (born 1971), Czech footballer
Vítězslav Jankových (born 1972), Czech ice hockey player
Vítězslav Mooc (born 1978), Czech footballer
Vítězslav Veselý (born 1983), Czech javelin thrower
Vítězslav Bílek (born 1983), Czech ice hockey player
Vítězslav Gebas (born 1984), Czech slalom canoeist
Vítězslav Sedlák (born 1991), Czech darts player

See also

Vítězslav Hálek Memorial

Czech masculine given names